Papa Alioune Diouf (born 22 June 1989) is a Senegalese professional footballer who plays as a forward or winger for Swedish club Kalmar FF. He made two appearances for the Senegal national team between 2010 and 2012.

Club career

Early career

Born in Dakar, Senegal, Papa Diouf started his career at Touré Kunda, before moved to Dakar Université Club in 2009.

On 20 February 2011, the Bulgarian Litex Lovech confirmed Diouf has joined on loan until the end of the season. He made his A PFG debut on 27 February, coming on as a 52nd-minute substitute for Dejan Djermanović in the 3–0 victory over Minyor Pernik; he then scored his first goal for the club 38 minutes later.

Kalmar FF
On 20 September 2011, Swedish club Kalmar FF confirmed that they had reached a deal with Dakar UC regarding Diouf, as of 1 January 2012 he would go on a six-month loan to Kalmar, together with Archford Gutu from Dynamos Harare, Zimbabwe. On 14 March Kalmar FF announced that they had decided to sign both Gutu and Diouf before Allsvenskan had started.

Return to Kalmar FF
On 21 June 2022, Diouf returned to Kalmar FF until the end of the 2022 season.

International career
Diouf earned his first cap with the Senegal national team as a substitute in a friendly against the Mexico on 10 May 2010.

Honours 
Litex Lovech
 Bulgarian A PFG: 2010–11

References

External links
 
 
 

1989 births
Living people
Serer sportspeople
Senegalese footballers
Association football forwards
Association football wingers
Senegal international footballers
PFC Litex Lovech players
Kalmar FF players
İstanbulspor footballers
Boluspor footballers
Ermis Aradippou FC players
First Professional Football League (Bulgaria) players
Allsvenskan players
TFF First League players
Cypriot Second Division players
Senegalese expatriate footballers
Senegalese expatriate sportspeople in Bulgaria
Expatriate footballers in Bulgaria
Senegalese expatriate sportspeople in Sweden
Expatriate footballers in Sweden
Senegalese expatriate sportspeople in Turkey
Expatriate footballers in Turkey
Senegalese expatriate sportspeople in Cyprus
Expatriate footballers in Cyprus